Germinal was the seventh month in the French Republican Calendar. The month was named after the Latin word germen, "germination". Germinal was the first month of the spring quarter (mois de printemps). It started March 21 or March 22, and ended April 19 or April 20. It follows Ventôse and precedes Floréal.

In the context of the French Revolution, Germinal sometimes refers to the downfall and execution of the Indulgents, Georges Danton and Camille Desmoulins, which took place during Germinal of 1794, four months before the Thermidorian Reaction in which Robespierre himself was executed. The events of Germinal 1794 signaled the beginning of the end of the Reign of Terror.

Day name table 

Like all FRC months, Germinal lasted 30 days and was divided into three 10-day weeks called décades (decades). Every day had the name of an agricultural plant, except the 5th (Quintidi) and 10th day (Decadi) of every decade, which had the name of a domestic animal (Quintidi) or an agricultural tool (Decadi). The 26th and 27th changed their role in later years.

Conversion table

See also
Germinal, a novel by Émile Zola titled after the month

External links 
Spring Quarter of Year II (facsimile)

French Republican calendar
March
April

sv:Franska revolutionskalendern#Månaderna